Ahmad Nabil Ahmad, also known as Nabil Ahmad, Nabil Raja Lawak, and simply Nabil (born 26 September 1983) is a Malaysian entertainer, comedian and actor. He worked as a motorcycle courier before winning the 2008 season of comedy competition Raja Lawak. Nabil has since won an award for hosting multiple television programs, beginning with MeleTOP in 2012, which he still hosts. He further expanded his roles by becoming a producer in 2017, and a film writer and director in 2018.

Early life 
Ahmad Nabil Ahmad was born on 26 September 1983, in Seremban, the capital of the state of Negeri Sembilan, Malaysia.

In 2008, Nabil was working as a motorcycle courier in the small town of Mambau, earning RM600 (about US$143) a month, when he was transferred to Kuala Lumpur for work. As a prank, the friend he was staying with signed him up for an audition for Raja Lawak (King of Comedy), a Malaysian television reality show that searches for comedic talent. Nabil did not have access to satellite television at his previous home, so was not familiar with the show, but tried out anyway.

Entertainment career 

After several weeks of competition, Nabil won the second season of Raja Lawak, which brought him to prominence as a comedian. Due to this victory he is sometimes known as "Nabil Raja Lawak". As an actor, Nabil played roles in the comedy films Pisau Cukur (2009), and Berani Punya Budak (2012) as well as in the later dramas Geng Bas Sekolah (2013) and Bila Kau Datang (2015).

From comedy, Nabil gradually transitioned to hosting television shows. He says that being a comedian involves a lot of pressure, being "expected to go up on stage and make people laugh immediately. ... with hosting I am much more relaxed, and everything feels less pressured.... But it allows me to still show my funny side by inserting jokes here and there."

His first hosting position, which he still holds, was entertainment talk show MeleTOP, in 2012. This was joined by music competition Gegar Vaganza, in 2014, both aired on Astro Ria. He was the original host of MeleTOP, along with female co-host Neelofa, and remained hosting the show when she left in 2019. He says he has been told he is synonymous with MeleTOP. He has also hosted episodes of the related annual entertainment awards show Anugerah MeleTOP Era.

In 2015 Nabil became host of HBO Sentral, a monthly program showcasing HBO Asia programs, taking over from Lisa Surihani. In 2016, Nabil became co-host of children's Islamic reality competition show, Ceria I-Star, on Astro Ceria, alongside Ustaz Yeop. In 2017, HBO sent him to Hollywood to interview stars during the 89th Academy Awards. In 2018, he was awarded the Best Entertainment Presenter/Host at the Asian Academy Creative Awards in Cannes, France.

In 2017, Nabil began to look for business opportunities outside of personally entertaining, so as not to depend on that as a sole source of income. He set up an entertainment production company which has produced television series and a film. In 2018, Nabil wrote his first made-for-television film, The Hantus, a Malaysian horror comedy film wherein he co-directed with Helmi Yusof, thus marking his directorial debut, which was released on June 15, 2018 under KMN Production. Filming began mostly in Kuala Lumpur, Gombak and Genting Highlands. In 2019 he added a YouTube channel called Lupk TV.

Personal life 
In 2011, Nabil married former AirAsia stewardess, Zira Ayoub. As of 2020, they have three daughters.

His entertainment success came with only limited financial security. During the 2020 Malaysia movement control order, he supported many friends from his hometown in Negeri Sembilan who had lost jobs so were worse off than he was, and says he was quite grateful for the government moratorium on debts that he otherwise would not have been able to pay off, due to canceled activities and job offers.

Filmography

Film

Television series

Telemovie

Theater

Radiography

Radio

References

External links 
 

1983 births
Living people
Malaysian male actors
Malaysian comedians
Malaysian infotainers
Malaysian television presenters
Malaysian businesspeople
People from Negeri Sembilan